Dmitri Viacheslavovich Domani (born 27 September 1974) is a Russian professional basketball official and a former player. He is 2.00 m tall and he weighs 98 kg. H formerly played for Saint Joseph's University.

Post-playing career and fraud conviction
From 2013 to 2015 he served as an executive director of the Russian Basketball Federation and a general manager of the Russia men's national basketball team.

In August 2015, Andrei Kirilenko was elected as the president of the federation and ordered a financial audit of their budget. As a consequence of that audit, Domani was charged with fraud. According to the first charge, the federation was paying for events and banquets in their office that were not actually held (according to invoices, events with 200 attendees were held in a 40 m2 room), with the money being kicked back to Domani and other federation managers. The second charge was paying for booklets and souvenirs that were not actually produced, and the third charge was signing a contract for medical examinations of the federation's employees with a person who did not have a medical license and did not perform any examinations. Domani left Russia for the United States, was eventually arrested in Montenegro in October 2017 and extradited to Russia in October 2018. On 17 October 2019, he was sentenced to 6 years of imprisonment for fraud, even though the prosecution only asked for a 3.5-years sentence. On 28 May 2020, his sentence was reduced to 4 years, making him eligible for parole.

Personal life
His father Vyacheslav Domani is an Olympic bronze medalist in volleyball.

Notes

External links
Eurocup Profile
Dynamo Moscow Profile

1974 births
Living people
BC Dynamo Moscow players
BC Krasnye Krylia players
PBC CSKA Moscow players
Russian men's basketball players
Russian expatriate basketball people in the United States
Saint Joseph's Hawks men's basketball players
Small forwards
Basketball players from Moscow
1998 FIBA World Championship players
Russian prisoners and detainees
1994 FIBA World Championship players